Hilgard Muller,  (4 May 1914 – 10 July 1985) was a South African politician of the National Party, Mayor of Pretoria in 1953–1955, elected an MP in 1958, appointed Minister of Foreign Affairs after the resignation of Eric Louw in 1964. He relinquished both posts in 1977. Studying at the University of Pretoria, he obtained a Rhodes Scholarship at the University of Oxford, earning a doctorate in law. Practicing law in Pretoria, he was elected to Pretoria city council in 1951, becoming Mayor of the city two years later. He relinquished his city council seat in 1957, being elected to House of Assembly the following year for Pretoria East. He chose not to run for his seat again in 1961, instead being appointed South African ambassador in London, but returned to parliament in 1964 immediately to be appointed Minister of Foreign Affairs.

Muller retired to private life in 1977 and was succeeded by Frederik Roelof "Pik" Botha, who kept the post until multi-racial elections in 1994.

References 

1914 births
1985 deaths
High Commissioners of South Africa to the United Kingdom
Ambassadors of South Africa to the United Kingdom
People from Potchefstroom
Afrikaner people
South African people of German descent
National Party (South Africa) politicians
Foreign ministers of South Africa
Members of the House of Assembly (South Africa)
South African diplomats
South African Rhodes Scholars
Chancellors of the University of Pretoria
University of Pretoria alumni